Jim "Goose" Ligon (February 22, 1944 – April 17, 2004) was an American professional basketball player.

A 6'7" forward/center, Ligon starred at Kokomo High School in Indiana but never played in college due to legal issues. In 1967, he earned a spot with the Kentucky Colonels of the American Basketball Association and went on to have a seven-year ABA career with the Colonels, Pittsburgh Condors, and Virginia Squires.  Ligon averaged 12.8 points per game and 10.9 rebounds per game in his ABA career and appeared in the 1969 ABA All-Star Game.

References

External links

 at Remember the ABA

1944 births
2004 deaths
American men's basketball players
Basketball players from Indiana
Centers (basketball)
Kentucky Colonels players
Parade High School All-Americans (boys' basketball)
Pittsburgh Condors players
Power forwards (basketball)
Sportspeople from Kokomo, Indiana
Virginia Squires players